Leela Majumdar ( Lila Mojumdar), (26 February 1908 – 5 April 2007) was a Bengali writer.

Early life
Born to Surama Devi and Pramada Ranjan Ray (who was the younger brother of Upendra Kishor Ray Choudhuri), Leela spent her childhood days at Shillong, where she studied at the Loreto Convent. Surama Devi had been adopted by Upendra Kishor Ray Choudhuri . Lila's grandfather had left his younger two daughters in care of his friends after his wife died. The eldest daughter was sent to a boarding house. Her maternal grandfather was Ramkumar Bhattacharya, who later became a sannyasi and was christened Ramananda Bharati. He was the first among Indians to visit Kailash and Mansarovar and wrote a travelogue Himaranya. In 1919, her father was transferred to Calcutta, and she joined St. John's Diocesan School from where she completed her matriculation examination. She ranked second among the girls in the matriculation examinations in 1924. She stood first in English (literature) both in her honours (graduation) and Master of Arts examination at the University of Calcutta. The family she belonged to made a notable contribution towards children's literature. Sunil Gangopadhyay says that while the Tagore family enthused everybody with drama, songs and literature for adults, the Ray Chaudhuri family took charge of laying the foundations of children's literature in Bengali.

Formative years
She joined Maharani Girls' School at Darjeeling as a teacher in 1931. On an invitation from Rabindranath Tagore she went and joined the school at Santiniketan, but she stayed only for about one year. She joined the women's section of Asutosh College in Calcutta but again did not continue for long. Thereafter, she spent most of her time as a writer. After two decades as a writer, she joined All India Radio as a producer and worked for about seven-eight years.

Her first story, Lakkhi chhele, was published in Sandesh in 1922. It was also illustrated by her. The children's magazine in Bengali was founded by her uncle, Upendrakishore Ray Chaudhuri in 1913 and was later edited by her cousin Sukumar Ray for sometime after the death of Upendrakishore in 1915. Together with her nephew Satyajit Ray and her cousin Nalini Das, she edited and wrote for Sandesh throughout her active writing life. Until 1994 she played an active role in the publication of the magazine.

Creative efforts
An incomplete bibliography lists 125 books including a collection of short stories, five books under joint authorship, 9 translated books and 19 edited books.
 
Her first published book was Boddi Nather Bari (1939) but her second compilation Din Dupure (1948) brought her considerable fame From the 1950s, her incomparable children's classics followed. Although humour was her forte, she also wrote detective stories, ghost stories and fantasies.

Her autobiographical sketch Pakdandi provides an insight into her childhood days in Shillong and also her early years at Santiniketan and with All India Radio.

Apart from her glittering array of children's literature, she wrote a cookbook, novels for adults (Sreemoti, Cheena Lanthan), and a biography of Rabindranath Tagore. She lectured on Abanindranath Tagore and translated his writings on art into English. She translated Jonathan Swift's Gulliver's Travels and Ernest Hemingway's The Old Man and the Sea into Bengali.

Satyajit Ray had thought of filming Padi Pishir Bormi Baksha. Arundhati Devi made it into a film in 1972. Chhaya Devi played the role of the young hero, Khoka's famed aunt Padipishi.

For a special Mahila Mahal (women's section) series of All-India Radio, dealing with the "natural and ordinary problems" in the everyday life of a girl growing up in a typical, middle-class, Bengali family, she created Monimala, the story of a "very ordinary girl" whose grandmother starts writing to her from when she turns 12, continuing into her marriage and motherhood.

Family
In 1933 she married Dr. Sudhir Kumar Majumdar, a renowned dentist who was a graduate of Harvard Dental School. For two decades she devoted herself to housekeeping. Her son Ranjan (b.1934)  is also a dentist and daughter Kamala (b. 1938) is married to Monishi Chatterjee, an oil engineer and grandson of first female painter of the Bengal school, Sunayani Devi. Her husband died in 1984. Apart from her children, she had, at the time of her death, two grandsons, two granddaughters and three great-grandchildren.

Works
Holde Pakhir Palok
Tong Ling
Naaku Gama
Podi Pishir Bormi Baksho
Boddi Nather Bori
Din Dupure
Chhotoder Srestho Galpo
Monimala
Bagher Chhokh
Bok Dharmik
Taka Gaachh
Lal Neel Deslai
Basher Phul
Moyna
Shalikh
Bhuter Bari
Aaguni Beguni
Tipur Upor Tipuni
Patka Chor
Aashare Galpo
Chiching Phank
Je Jai Boluk
Chhotoder Tal Betal
Batash Bari
Bagh Shikari Bamun
Baghyar Galpo
Shibur Diary
Howrahr Dari
Ferari
Nepor Boi
Aar Konokhane
Kheror Khata
Ei Je Dekha
Pakdandi
Sreemoti
Cheena Lanthan
Moni Manil
Naatghar
Batashbari
Kaag Noi
Shob Bhuture
Bak Badh Pala
 Megher Sari Dhorte Nari
Pori didir Bor
Pesha Bodol
Batas Bari
Monimala
Elshe Ghai
Pagla Pagolder golpo 
Kuri
Chagla Pagla Leela Majumdar

Awards
Holde Pakhir Palok won the state award for children's literature, Bak Badh Pala won the Sangeet Natak Akademi Award from the Government of India in 1963, Aar Konokhane won Rabindra Puraskar from the Government of West Bengal in 1969. She had also won the Suresh Smriti Puraskar, Vidyasagar Puraskar, Bhubaneswari Medal for lifetime achievement, and Ananda Puraskar. She has been awarded the Deshikottama by Visva Bharati, and honorary D.Litt. by Burdwan, North Bengal and Calcutta Universities.

Legacy
In 2019, a documentary film has been made on Lila Majumdar entitled "Peristan - The World of Lila Majumdar ".

References

1908 births
2007 deaths
Bengali writers
Bengali-language writers
Bengali detective fiction writers
Writers from Kolkata
Recipients of the Rabindra Puraskar
Bengali–English translators
English–Bengali translators
University of Calcutta alumni
Academic staff of the University of Calcutta
Indian children's writers
20th-century translators
Women writers from West Bengal
20th-century Indian novelists
20th-century Indian women writers
Novelists from West Bengal
People associated with Shillong